Kiselev is a rural locality (a khutor) in Lobakinskoye Rural Settlement, Surovikinsky District, Volgograd Oblast, Russia. The population was 258 as of 2010. There are 7 streets.

Geography 
Kiselev is located on the Dobraya River, 35 km north of Surovikino (the district's administrative centre) by road. Lobakin is the nearest rural locality.

References 

Rural localities in Surovikinsky District